Amazing Grace: Original Score from the Motion Picture is another soundtrack for the movie Amazing Grace starring Ioan Gruffudd, featuring an original score composed by David Arnold.

History 
David Arnold, who is best known for composing scores for films, such as Independence Day, Stargate, and Godzilla, completed his journey from the film genres of action-adventure to art house. Amazing Grace is based on the 20-year crusade of William Wilberforce to end slavery in the British Empire, as Arnold includes the scores of quasi-folk songs to Negro spirituals; his basic material, however, remains unchanged from earlier projects.

Arnold's tone for this project is far more earnest than before, one that hears distant echos of "Britten's Sinfonia da Requiem" and "Four Sea Interludes" at times, but his score has the merit of being the music that solely functions as an adjunct with an imaging enhancement on the screen, as a medium, not the message.

Production 
Composer Nicholas Dadd produced, orchestrated, and conducted on this soundtrack. It features an unnamed group of session musicians contracted by Isobel Griffiths.

Track listing 
All songs written and composed by David Arnold.

( * = iTunes album-only bonus track)

Awards
In 2008, the album won a Dove Award for Instrumental Album of the Year at the 39th GMA Dove Awards.

References

Amazing Grace
2007 soundtrack albums
David Arnold soundtracks
Sparrow Records albums